DeWitt Bodeen (July 25, 1908 — March 12, 1988) was an American film screenwriter and television writer best known for writing Cat People (1942).

Biography
Born Homer DeWitt Bodeen on July 25, 1908, in Fresno, California, he began his career as an actor and wrote more than 20 plays before entering the film business. He began his career in the film industry when his stage work drew the attention of film writer and producer Val Lewton, who arranged for Bodeen to work as a research assistant to British novelist Aldous Huxley.

He published his first book-length contribution to entertainment history in 1937, Ladies of the Footlights, a slim volume of theater celebrity profiles.

In the late 1930s, he began working for RKO and worked his way up to a script writer. His screenwriting credits include Cat People (1942), The Curse of the Cat People (1944), The Seventh Victim (1943), The Enchanted Cottage (1945),  I Remember Mama (1948), Night Song (1948), and Billy Budd (1962).

His play Harvest of Years premiered on Broadway in January 1948. It ran for two weeks.

Beginning in the 1950s he moved to television, writing mainly for anthology shows including Robert Montgomery Presents, Climax!, and Schlitz Playhouse of Stars among others.

Bodeen was gay. In the 1950s he was Val Dufour's companion, living with him.

In his later years he became a historian of Hollywood and the film industry. He wrote articles for the journal Films in Review and Focus on Film. His books included The Films of Cecil B. DeMille (1969), The Films and Career of Maurice Chevalier (1973), From Hollywood!: the careers of 15 great American stars (1972), and More from Hollywood!: the careers of 15 great American stars (1977).

He was still writing in 1979 at the age of 70, when he lived at the Motion Picture Country Home in Woodland Hills, Los Angeles. He died there on March 12, 1988.

Notes

References

External links

1908 births
1988 deaths
American male screenwriters
American television writers
American male television writers
20th-century American male writers
20th-century American screenwriters